This is a list of Italian American entertainers.

Actors

Composers and conductors
 Alfredo Antonini 
 Trey Anastasio
 Frankie Avalon
 Angelo Badalamenti
 Josefina Benedetti 
 Joe Bonamassa
 Jon Bon Jovi
Curt Cacioppo
 Teddy Castellucci
Mario Castelnuovo Tedesco
Giancarlo Castro D'Addona
 Lou Christie
Anton Coppola
Carmine Coppola
 John Corigliano
 Chick Corea
 Don Costa 
 Glen Danzig
 Bobby Darin
 Norman Dello Joio
Carmen Dragon
 JoAnn Falletta
 John Ferritto
 Nicolas Flagello
 Dominic Frontiere
 Michael Giacchino
 Madonna 
 Vittorio Giannini
 Bill Conti
 Don Costa
Vince Guaraldi
 George Greeley
 Chris Isaak
 Alicia Keys
 Guy Lombardo
 Henry Mancini
 Chuck Mangione
Giancarlo Menotti
 Giorgio Moroder
 Francesco Maria Scala
 Dario Marianelli
 Natalie Merchant
 Tom Morello
 Joe Perry
Leonard Pennario
 John Petrucci
 Louis Prima
 Suzi Quatro
Nicola Rescigno
 L. Scinti Roger
Pete Rugolo
 Bobby Rydell
 Joe Satriani
 Alan Silvestri
 Ray Sinatra
 Robert Spano
 Nikki Sixx
 Dick Stabile
 Terig Tucci
 Arturo Toscanini
 Steven Tyler
 Steve Vai
 Jerry Vale
 Frank Zappa

Fashion models
Lily Aldridge
Ruby Aldridge
Alessandra Ambrosio
Hailey Baldwin
Brian Bianchini
Alyssa Campanella
Gia Carangi (1960–1986)
Anthony Catanzaro
Olivia Culpo
Adrianne Curry
Lil Debbie
Charles Dera
Emily Didonato
Christine Dolce
CJ Gibson
Vanessa Hessler
Willa Holland
Laura Lyons
Jonathon Prandi
Isabella Rossellini
Elettra Rossellini Wiedemann
Amanda Sudano

Theater directors
Gerard Alessandrini
Michael Bennett
Lawrence Carra
Michael Cassara
Bart DeLorenzo
Frank Ferrante
Leonard Foglia
Albert Innaurato
Joe Mantello
Tom Palumbo
John Rando

Movie directors and producers

Emile Ardolino (1943-1993), filmmaker, choreographer and producer
Annabelle Attanasio (born 1993), actress and filmmaker, daughter of producer Paul Attanasio
Paul Attanasio (born 1959), screenwriter and film and television producer
Joseph Barbera (1911–2006), Oscar and Emmy-winning animation director and producer (Hanna-Barbera Productions)
Greg Berlanti (born 1972), writer, producer and film director, known for his work on the television series Dawson's Creek and Riverdale
Ed Bianchi (born 1942), television director and producer. He is better known for his work on Deadwood, Boardwalk Empire
Frank Borzage (1893–1962), film director and actor famed for his mystical romanticism
Albert R. Broccoli (1909–1996), producer of all but one of the first 17 James Bond movies
Barbara Broccoli (born 1960), producer, daughter of producer Albert R. Broccoli
Nicolas Cage, actor, director and producer
Frank Capra (1897–1991), film director and a major creative force behind a number of popular films of the 1930s and 1940s
David Chase (born 1945), creator of The Sopranos
Michael Cimino (1939–2016), film director, The Deer Hunter
Chris Columbus (born 1958), film director, Home Alone
Francis Ford Coppola (born 1939), five-time Academy Award-winning film director, producer, and screenwriter
Roman Coppola (born 1965), film and music video director
Sofia Coppola (born 1971), director, actress, producer
Frank Coraci (born 1966), film director
Gerard Damiano (1928–2008), former adult film director
Pat DiCicco (1909–1978),movie producer, and occasional actor, as well as an alleged mobster working for Lucky Luciano
Raymond De Felitta (born 1964), independent film director, screenwriter and musician 
Barbara De Fina (born 1949), film director
Dino De Laurentiis (1919–2010), film producer. He produced or co-produced more than 500 films, of which 38 were nominated for Academy Awards
Brian De Palma (born 1940), movie director
Tom DeSanto (born 1968), film producer
Danny DeVito (born 1944), actor, director, and Oscar-nominated producer

Tom Savini (born 1946) actor, prosthetic makeup artist, director
Denise Di Novi (born 1956), film producer
Anthony C. Ferrante, film director
Abel Ferrara (born 1951), film director
Vincent Gallo (born 1962), movie actor and director starring in independent movies; also a recognized painter, male fashion model, musician, motorcycle racer and breakdancer
Gregory La Cava (1892–1952), film director of the 1930s
Walter Lantz (1899–1994), Oscar-winning animation director and producer, creator of Woody Woodpecker
John R. Leonetti, director, cinematographer
Matthew F. Leonetti, cinematographer
Garry Marshall, TV and film producer, director, writer, and actor
Theodore Melfi, screenwriter, film director, and producer
Vincente Minnelli, director
Greg Mottola, director
Nicholas Pileggi (born 1933), film director
Robert Pulcini, film director
Guido Quaroni, computer modeler and computer animation maker at Pixar Animation Studios
Frank Renzulli, actor, writer and producer
Lou Romano, member of the Art Department at Pixar Animation Studios
David O. Russell (born 1958), film director
Russo brothers, film and television directors
Aaron Russo, film producer
SallyAnn Salsano, executive producer, known for Jersey Shore
Damon Santostefano
Martin Scorsese (born 1942), iconic Academy Award-winning film director
Tina Sinatra (born 1948), movie producer and former actress
Quentin Tarantino (born 1963), film director, actor, and Oscar-winning screenwriter
Marlo Thomas (born 1937), actress, producer, author, and social activist
Stanley Tucci (born 1960), actor, writer, film producer and film director
Maurizio Vasco (born 1955), director, writer, independent producer
Thomas Vitale, Senior Vice President of Programming & Original Movies for the Sci Fi Channel
Robert Zemeckis, filmmaker and screenwriter

Television personalities
Farrah Abraham (born 1991), reality TV star
Aquaria (born: Giovanni Palandrani, 1996), drag queen
Maria Bello (born 1967), actress
Mike Bongiorno (1924 – 2009), television host. After a few experiences in the US, he started working on RAI in the 1950s and was considered to be the most popular host in Italy.
Carmine Gotti Agnello (born 1986), reality TV star
Frank Gotti Agnello (born 1990), reality TV star
John Gotti Agnello (born 1987), reality TV star
Adam Carolla (born 1964), comedic radio and television personality
Kristin Cavallari (born 1987)[, television personality, fashion entrepreneur and author
Neil Cavuto (born 1958), television host and commentator hosting Your World with Neil Cavuto and Cavuto on Business on the Fox News Channel
Stephen Colletti (born 1986), reality TV star
Deena Cortese (born 1987), reality TV star, known for Jersey Shore
Chris Cuomo (born 1970), journalist is the presenter of Cuomo Prime Time, a weeknight news analysis show on CNN
Tony Danza (born 1951), actor and talk show host
Giada De Laurentiis (born 1970), chef, writer, TV personality, host of the Food Network programs Everyday Italian, Behind the Bash, Giada's Weekend Getaways and Giada in Paradise
Pauly DelVecchio (born 1980), reality TV star, known for Jersey Shore
Robert De Laurentiis, television director
Gary Dell'Abate (born 1961), producer of The Howard Stern Show and co-host of The Wrap-Up Show
Giuliana DePandi (born 1975), host of E! News
Jennifer “JWoww” Farley (born 1986), reality TV star, known for Jersey Shore
Guy Fieri (born 1968), restaurateur, author and television personality
Annette Funicello (1942–2013), singer and actress, Walt Disney's most popular Mouseketeer
Sammi “Sweetheart” Giancola (born 1987), reality TV star, known for Jersey Shore
Vinny Guadagnino (born 1987), reality TV star, known for Jersey Shore
Victoria Gotti (born 1962), star of Growing Up Gotti on the A&E Network
Jimmy Kimmel (born 1967), television comedy talk-show host and producer
Jay Leno (born 1950), comedian, known as host of The Tonight Show and the Jay Leno Show
Ronnie Ortiz-Magro (born 1985), reality TV star, known for Jersey Shore
Anthony Melchiorri (born 1966), reality TV star
 Alyssa Milano (born 1972), actress, producer and former singer. Star of Who's the Boss?
Kelly Monaco (born 1976), model, actress, and reality television contestant
Danny Pintauro (born 1976), actor best known for his role as Jonathan Bower on the popular American sitcom Who's the Boss? 
Angelina Pivarnick (born 1986): reality TV star, known for Jersey Shore
Rachael Ray (born 1968), Emmy-winning television personality and author
Gina Carano (born 1982), model, former MMA fighter and actress
Leah Remini (born 1970), actress
Kelly Ripa (born 1970), actress and talk show host
Jai Rodriguez (born 1979), actor and culture guide on Queer Eye for the Straight Guy
Andy Samberg (born 1978), actor, comedian, writer, producer and musician
Dave Filoni (born 1974), director, producer, writer and voice actor
Maria Sansone (born 1981), host of "The 9" on Yahoo! and special events for TV Guide Network
Mike “The Situation” Sorrentino (born 1982), reality TV star, known for Jersey Shore
Will Sasso (born 1975), actor, podcaster; American citizen of Canadian birth
Kim Zolciak (born 1978), reality TV star

Musicians
See also List of Sicilian-American jazz musicians.

Sal Abruscato, hard rock/heavy metal drummer, known for his work with early Type O Negative and Life of Agony
Roberto Alagna, operatic tenor
Steve Albini (born 1962), indie rock musician, producer
Trey Anastasio, leader of jam band Phish
John "DOC" Anello, Leader of Swing Machine Big Band, Singer, Sax player
Phil Anselmo, heavy metal singer, a leading member of Pantera.
Vinny Appice, heavy metal drummer
Frankie Avalon, (born 1940) trumpet, singer, and actor
Veronica Ballestrini, singer-songwriter
Frankie Banali, drummer, Quiet Riot
Joey Belladonna, heavy metal singer
Remo Belli (1927 – 2016), jazz drummer
Frank Bello, heavy metal bass player for Anthrax
Louie Bellson, born Luigi Ballassoni, big band drummer
Charlie Benante, heavy metal drummer for Anthrax
Dean Benedetti, jazz saxophonist
Bia, rapper
Corbin Bleu, singer and actor in High School Musical; Italian mother
Joe Bonamassa, blues rock musician, singer, and songwriter.
Jon Bon Jovi (born 1962), born John Francis Bongiovi, rock star, actor
Bizzy Bone, born Bryon McCane, a rapper from the group Bone Thugs N Harmony, part Italian on mother's side
Patrick Bonfrisco, drummer, Enewetak
Mike Bordin, rock drummer from band Faith No More
Chris Botti, jazz trumpeter; Italian on father's side
Terry Bozzio (born 1950), drummer best known for his stint with Frank Zappa
Vito Bratta, glam metal guitarist and songwriter, former member of glam metal band White Lion
Jeff Buckley (1966–1997), rock musician with distinctive vocal and compositional abilities; grandmother of Italian descent
Tim Buckley (1947–1975), folk, jazz, and rock artist;  father of the musician Jeff Buckley; mother of Italian descent
Sam Butera, jazz saxophonist
Conte Candoli, jazz trumpeter
Pete Candoli, jazz trumpeter
Freddy Cannon (born 1940), born Frederick Anthony Picariello, rock and roll singer, had three top ten hits
Chris Carrabba, lead singer of Dashboard Confessional and former lead singer of Further Seems Forever
Harry Wayne Casey, leader of K.C. & the Sunshine Band; credited for inventing the boogie disco band sound; Italian on his mother's side
Micheal Castaldo, singer, songwriter and producer
Suzette Charles, singer, entertainer, former Miss America
Gary Cherone, former lead singer of Extreme and Van Halen
Lou Christie (born 1943), born Lugee Alfredo Giovanni Sacco on February, singer-songwriter
Dr. Chud, born David Calabrese, former drummer for the Misfits
John Cocuzzi, jazz musician
Vinnie Colaiuta, drummer famous in jazz circles for his virtuosity and his stint with Frank Zappa
Louie Clemente, born Luciano Angelo Di Clemente in Lioni, Italy, original drummer of thrash metal band Testament
Jerry Colonna (1904-1986) actor, entertainer, singer, trombonist
Russ Columbo (1908–1934), composer, singer, violinist and actor
Chick Corea, jazz pianist virtuoso, played with Miles Davis
John Corigliano Sr., violinist concertmaster of New York Philharmonic Orchestra
Alessandro Cortini, rock star, keyboardist for Nine Inch Nails
Don Costa, pop music arranger
Jack Costanzo, percussionist, The King of Bongo
Ashley Costello, singer, New Years Day
Dan Costello, guitarist, played with The DeFranco Family
Ward Costello (1919–2009), actor/composer/lyricist
Peter Criss, born George Peter John Criscuola, drummer, formerly of KISS
Jim Croce, folk and rock singer-songwriter
Warren Cuccurullo, guitarist for Frank Zappa, Missing Persons and Duran Duran
Rivers Cuomo (born 1970), member of Weezer
Alan Dale (1926–2002), born Aldo Sigismondi, singer of traditional popular and rock'n'roll music
Glenn Danzig, born Glenn Anzalone, former lead singer and one of the founders of Misfits
Bobby Darin (1936–1973), born Walden Robert Cassotto, one of the most popular rock and roll teen idols of the late 1950s
Decoy, born Nicholas Edward Galluzzo, also known as Nicholas Edward Case; Italian-French mother and Italian father; rapper and singer
Pietro Deiro, accordionist
Buddy DeFranco, jazz musician
Tony DeFranco, lead singer and guitarist of The DeFranco Family
Chris DeGarmo, ex-guitarist of 1980s rock band Queensrÿche
Joey DeMaio, bassist, main songwriter and one of the founding members of the heavy metal band Manowar
Liberty DeVitto, rock drummer for Billy Joel
Tommy DeVito (musician)
Al Di Meola, jazz fusion guitarist
Vince DiFiore, trumpeter and keyboardist
Ani DiFranco, singer/songwriter
Orlando DiGirolamo, jazz musician
Mike DiMeo, former singer of Riot and Masterplan
Dion DiMucci, leading doo wop, rock and roll, and blues artist of the 1950s and 60s
Ronnie James Dio (1942–2010), heavy metal singer
Joe Dolce, Australian born singer/songwriter, poet and essayist 
Micky Dolenz, singer and drummer for The Monkees
Charlie Dominici, ex-Dream Theater vocalist, founding member of Dominici
Sully Erna, born Salvatore Erna, lead singer of the band Godsmack, of full Italian descent
Faith Evans, singer
Queen Naija, singer, (African American and Italian mother)
Nick Falcon, psychobilly guitarist, founding member of The Young Werewolves
Santo Farina, one half of the guitar duo Santo and Johnny, who had a huge instrumental hit with "Sleepwalk" in 1959.
Joe Farrell, born Joseph Firrantello, jazz saxophonist
Josh Farro, lead guitarist for Paramore
Zac Farro, drummer for Paramore
Ted Fio Rito, composer, orchestra leader, and keyboardist
Sam Fogarino, drummer for Interpol
Lita Ford, singer and guitarist, formerly of The Runaways
Johnny Frigo, jazz violinist and bassist
John Frusciante, guitarist for the Red Hot Chili Peppers
Steve Gadd, world-famous jazz and session drummer
Theodore L. Gargiulo (1915–2006), conductor, composer, and musicologist.
Bob Gaudio, singer, keyboardist and composer
Lady Gaga, singer, actress, songwriter. Mother and Father of Italian descent 
Selena Gomez, singer, actress, songwriter. Mother of Italian descent.
Stéphane Grappelli, jazz violinist
George Greeley, pianist, film and television composer, conductor, recording artist
DJ Green Lantern, born James D'Agostini, hip-hop DJ; father is Puerto Rican and mother is Italian
Carla Harvey (born 1976), singer for the Butcher Babies
Davey Havok (born 1975), born David Paden Passaro, later changed to David Paden Marchand, vocalist for AFI
Frank Iero, rhythm guitarist for the band My Chemical Romance
Chris Impellitteri, guitarist
Chris Isaak, songwriter, singer and actor; mother is Italian-American
Alicia Keys, pianist; mother is Italian (Augello)
Morgana King, jazz singer
Scott LaFaro, jazz musician
Danny Lamagna, drummer of Agnostic Front
John LaPorta, jazz clarinetist
Eddie Lang, guitarist
Mario Lanza, tenor, actor and Hollywood film star 
Nick LaRocca, jazz musician
Adam Lazzara, lead singer of Taking Back Sunday
Kenny Loggins, singer-songwriter and guitarist
Carmen Lombardo, vocalist and composer
Dave Lombardo, drummer of Testament and Misfits
Guy Lombardo, born Gaetano Alberto "Guy" Lombardo, bandleader and violinist
Lebert Lombardo, named by Louis Armstrong as one of his favorite trumpeters
Victor Lombardo, saxophonist
Joe Long, born Joseph LaBracio, bassist and vocal arranger for The Four Seasons
Joe Lovano, jazz saxophonist
Lydia Lunch, Musician, poet, actress, spoken word
Madonna, pop singer, known as the Queen of Pop since the 1980's
Mike Mangini, drummer of Dream Theater
Dodo Marmarosa, jazz pianist
Dean Martin (1917–1995), singer and film actor, one of the most famous artists and TV personality of the 20th century period
Pat Martino, jazz guitarist
Fred Mascherino, guitarist and backing vocalist of Taking Back Sunday
Nick Massi (1927–2000), bassist and singer of The Four Seasons
Natalie Merchant, singer and songwriter, father is of Italian descent
Jo Dee Messina, country music artist
Joe Messina, guitarist
Lucia Micarelli, violinist
Bobby Militello, saxophonist for Dave Brubeck Quartet
Chieli Minucci, smooth jazz guitarist
Joe Morello, drummer for Dave Brubeck Quartet
Tom Morello, guitarist for Rage Against the Machine
Sal Mosca, jazz pianist
Tony Mottola, guitarist
DJ Muggs, DJ, audio engineer and record producer
Mitchel Musso, musician, actor, star of Disney's Hannah Montana; part Italian on father's side
Vido Musso, jazz clarinetist, saxophonist and bandleader
Ken Navarro, contemporary jazz guitarist
Jerry Only, born Gerald Caiafa, bassist for the Misfits
Frankie Palmeri, Emmure singer
Daryl Palumbo, singer, frontman for bands Glassjaw, Head Automatica, and Color Film
Felix Pappalardi, rock and roll bassist and producer
Joe Pass (1929–1994), born Joseph Anthony Jacobi Passalaqua, jazz guitarist
John Patitucci, electric and acoustic bass virtuoso; played with Chick Corea and Wayne Shorter 
Art Pepper, jazz musician
Joe Perry born Joseph Anthony Pereira, lead guitarist and contributing songwriter for the rock band Aerosmith
Vincent Persichetti, composer
John Petrucci, heavy metal guitarist, founding member of Dream Theater
Roxy Petrucci, drummer for Madam X and Vixen
Flip Phillips, jazz saxophonist
Guy Picciotto, early Emo personality, noted for Rites of Spring and Fugazi
Bucky Pizzarelli, classical jazz guitarist
John Pizzarelli, jazz guitarist
Martin Pizzarelli, jazz double-bassist
Jeff Porcaro, rock drummer from band Toto
Joe Porcaro, jazz drummer, dad of three Porcaro's brothers members of the rock band Toto
Mike Porcaro, rock bassist from band Toto
Steve Porcaro, keyboardist, songwriter, singer, and film composer from band Toto
Mike Portnoy, drummer, founding member of Dream Theater
Teddy Powell, born Teodoro Paolella, jazz guitarist, composer and big band leader
Louis Prima (1910–1978), Italian-American jazz musician, singer, and actor
Suzi Quatro, born Susan Kay Quattrocchi, rock star, bassist singer-songwriter
Moxie Raia, born Laura Raia, singer-songwriter 
Twiggy Ramirez, born Jeordie Osbourne White, rock star, ex-bassist for Marilyn Manson
Ruggiero Ricci (1918–2012), violin virtuoso
Johnny Rivers, born John Ramistella, early rock'n roll singer with many hit records
Adrian Rollini, jazz saxophonist and vibraphonist
Tony Romano, jazz guitarist and singer
Leon Roppolo (1902–1943), prominent early jazz clarinetist and composer
Frank Rosolino, jazz trombonist
Matt Rubano, bassist of Taking Back Sunday
Pete Rugolo, jazz composer, arranger and record producer
Russ - Hip hop rapper of Italian descent
William Russo, jazz musician
Bobby Rydell (born 1942), born Robert Louis Ridarelli in Philadelphia, Pennsylvania, "teen idol" in the early days of rock and roll
Melanie Safka, mother is of Italian descent
Ralph Santolla, metal guitarist; has a custom Jackson guitar with the Italian flag painted on it
Joe Satriani, guitar virtuoso
Haley Scarnato, American Idol season 6  contestant
Jack Scott (1936–2019), born Giovanni Dominico Scafone Jr. in Ontario, Canada, Canadian/American singer and songwriter
Anthony Sepe, former Memphis May Fire rhythm guitarist
John Serry, Sr. (1915–2003), born Giovanni Serrapica, concert accordionist, composer, arranger, educator;  father of John Serry, Jr.
Frank Sinatra, arguably the most famous personality in American history
Ramón Stagnaro, peruvian american guitarist of Italian father  
Nikki Sixx, born Frank Carlton Serafino Feranna Jr., songwriter and bassist of Mötley Crüe and Sixx:A.M.
DJ Skribble, DJ and producer
Jamie Spaniolo, rapper
Robert Spano, conductor and pianist
Bruce Springsteen, songwriter, guitarist, rock star
Gwen Stefani, singer, frontwoman for the rock band No Doubt
Vinnie Stigma, lead guitarist of Agnostic Front
Taylor Swift, singer/songwriter; father is part Italian 
Joseph Tarsia
Johnny Thunders, born John A. Genzale, rock musician
Mark Tremonti, lead guitarist of Tremonti
Lennie Tristano, jazz pianist and composer
Steven Tyler, born Steven Victor Tallarico, rock star, songwriter; Italian on his father's side
Steve Vai, guitar virtuoso
Francis Valentino, drummer
Steven Van Zandt (born 1950), musician, songwriter, arranger, record producer, actor (The Sopranos), and radio disc jockey 
Ronnie Vannucci, drummer for The Killers
Zacky Vengeance, rhythm guitarist for the band Avenged Sevenfold
Joe Venuti, jazz violinist
Tony Visconti, rock music producer (based in Britain)
Doyle Wolfgang Von Frankenstein, born Paul Caiafa, former guitarist for the Misfits
Chris Vrenna (born 1967), producer and drummer
George Wallington, jazz pianist
Gerard Way, lead singer for the band My Chemical Romance
Mikey Way, bass guitarist for the band My Chemical Romance
Dean Ween, born Michael Melchiondo, Ween guitarist
"Weird Al" Yankovic (born 1959), parodist and comedy musician; mother's side is Italian
Timi Yuro, soul and R&B singer
Z-Trip, born Zach Sciacca, DJ and producer
Dweezil Zappa, rock guitarist
Frank Zappa (1940–1993), composer, guitarist, singer and satirist; Sicilian father and 3/4 Italian mother
Neil Zaza, neo-classical melodic guitarist
Warren DeMartini, former guitarist of Ratt, born to an Italian-American family.
Joe Lynn Turner, former vocalist of Deep Purple and Rainbow, born Joseph Arthur Mark Linquito, to an Italian-American family.

Songwriters
Francesca Battistelli (born 1985), gospel music songwriter and performer
Michael Bradley, songwriter, singer, artist; 3/4 Italian
Peter Cincotti (born 1983), singer-pianists and songwriter
Rivers Cuomo (born 1970), member of Weezer
Bob DiPiero, songwriter, Nashville Songwriter Hall of Fame
Bob Gaudio, songwriter, member of The Four Seasons
Christina Grimmie, singer and songwriter
James V. Monaco, early American songwriter "You Made Me Love You"
Laura Nyro, songwriter, Italian father, Russian Jewish and Polish Jewish mother
Tony Romeo, songwriter, known for work on The Partridge Family
Patti Scialfa, father of Sicilian ancestry
Harry Warren (1893–1981), born Salvatore Guaragna, wrote more hit songs than anyone else in early 20th-century America

Singers

Al Alberts, born Al Albertini, singer and musician known for work with The Four Aces
Trey Anastasio, singer, guitarist, songwriter
Romina Arena, pop classical crossover singer
Billie Joe Armstrong (born 1972), singer, songwriter, musician, actor and record producer
Frankie Avalon (born 1940), born Francis Avallone, singer, actor
Kelsea Ballerini (born 1993), country music singer
Sara Bareilles (born 1979), singer and songwriter
Kaci Battaglia, singer
Tony Bennett, born Anthony Dominick Benedetto, singer
Bhad Bhabie (born 2003), rapper
Lory Bianco (born 1963),  singer and actress
Sonny Bono (1935–1998), born Salvatore Phillip Bono, producer, actor, and politician
Eddie Brigati (born 1945), singer, composer for the 60s rock band The Young Rascals
Gioia Bruno, born Carmen Gioia Bruno, singer
Freddy Cannon (born 1940), born Frederick Anthony Picariello Jr., rock and roll singer
Mina Caputo, singer, member of Life of Agony
Harry Wayne Casey (born 1940), leader of K.C. and the Sunshine Band; Italian mother
Micheal Castaldo, singer, songwriter, producer, entrepreneur
Felix Cavaliere (born 1942), singer-songwriter for 60s rock band The Young Rascals
Michael Cerveris (born 1960), actor, singer, and guitarist
Lou Christie (born 1943), born Luigi Alfredo Giovanni Sacco
Perry Como (1912–2001), born Pierino Ronald Como
Don Cornell (1919–2004), born Luigi Francesco Varlaro, a popular singer
Chrissy Costanza (born 1995), singer-songwriter for Against The Current
Jim Croce (1943–1973), singer
Rivers Cuomo (born 1970), member of Weezer
Victor Damiani
Vic Damone (1928–2018), born Vito Rocco Farinola, singer
Bobby Darin (1936-1973), born Walden Robert Cassotto, singer
James Darren (born 1936), born James Ercolani, actor, singer, teen idol
Jimmy Durante (1893–1980), singer, pianist, comedian, and actor
Diana DeGarmo (born 1987), runner-up on American Idol (Season 3); half Italian
Johnny Desmond (1920–1985), born Giovanni Alfredo De Simone,  popular singer
Tommy DeVito (1928–2020), musician and singer, member of The Four Seasons
Ani DiFranco (born 1970), Grammy Award-winning singer, guitarist, songwriter, Italian American on father's side
Dion DiMucci (born 1939), better known as Dion
Kara Dioguardi, singer of Italian and Albanian heritage
Eamon, Italian mother (née Zizzo), Irish father
Lita Ford, also guitarist, born in England; Italian mother
Fabian Forte (born 1942), singer, teen idol, actor
Sergio Franchi (1926–1990), born Sergio Franci Galli, singer, Broadway and television actor
Connie Francis (born 1936), born Concetta Rosa Maria Franconero, singer
Frankee, born Nicole Francine Aiello, singer
Farrah Franklin, singer-songwriter, actress, also African-American
Annette Funicello (1942–2013), singer, actress, Mickey Mouse Club and beach party movies in the 60s
Frank Gari (born 1942), late 1950s singer; founder of Gari Communications
Bob Gaudio (born 1942), singer, songwriter, and record producer, member of The Four Seasons
Sonny Geraci (1946–2017), singer
Selena Gomez, Italian on mother's side
Mikalah Gordon (born 1988), singer
Eydie Gorme (1928–2013), father was from Sicily
Lou Gramm (born 1950), born Louis Andrew Grammatico, rock vocalist for Foreigner
Ariana Grande (born 1993), born Ariana Grande-Butera, singer, songwriter and actress
Mitch Grassi, member of Grammy Award-winning a cappella group Pentatonix
Buddy Greco (1926–2017), born Armando Greco, singer 
Francesca Gregorini (born 1968), singer and songwriter; daughter of Jewish/Irish American model Barbara Bach and Italian businessman Augusto Gregorini
Frank Guarrera (1923–2007), opera baritone
Halsey (born 1994), born Ashley Nicolette Frangipane, singer-songwriter
Phyllis Hyman (1949–1995), jazz and R&B singer; father is Cuban/Italian and mother was African American
Jessicka, born Jessica Fodera in Brooklyn
Alicia Keys
Morgana King (1930–2018), born Maria Grazia Morgana Messina, jazz singer 
Julius La Rosa (1930–2016), singer popular in the 1950s
 Rudy La Scala – singer and composer
Lady Gaga (born 1986), born Stefani Joanne Angelina Germanotta, singer and songwriter
Frankie Laine (1913–2007), born Frank Paul LoVecchio, one of the most successful singers in history
Mario Lanza (1921–1959), born Alfred Arnold Cocozza, recording star, operatic tenor, film actor
Cyndi Lauper, part Italian
Demi Lovato, singer, also has Mexican ancestry
Madonna, born Madonna Louise Ciccone in Michigan, singer, songwriter, record producer and film director, daughter of Italian father and French-Canadian mother
Sanjaya Malakar, American Idol season six finalist; half-Italian through his mother
 Pablo Manavello – Italian-born Venezuelan composer, guitarist, singer and songwriter
Al Martino, singer
Guy Marks (1923-1987) (Mario Scarpa) actor, comedian, singer and impressionist
Dean Martin (1917–1995), born Dino Crocetti, singer and film actor
Deana Martin, singer, actress, and author; daughter of Dean Martin
Al Martino (1927–2009), born Alfred Cini in Philadelphia, Pennsylvania 
Nick Massi (1935–2000), born Nicholas Macioci, bass singer for the Four Seasons
Don Mclean (born 1945), singer-songwriter; Italian mother
Tim McGraw (born 1967), country music singer and actor, mother is of Italian descent
Liza Minnelli (born 1946), singer, actress; Italian father
Anna Moffo (1932–2006), lyric-coloratura soprano
Lou Monte (1917–1989)
Mya (born 1979)
Stacie Orrico (born 1986), contemporary Christian music/pop singer
Nicola Paone (1915–2003), singer-songwriter
Gretchen Parlato (born 1976), jazz singer
Christina Perri (born 1986), singer and songwriter
Johnny Rivers (born 1942), born John Ramistella, popular rock singer, songwriter and guitarist
Jimmy Roselli (1925–2011), singer
Bobby Rydell (born 1942), born Robert Ridarelli, singer
Haley Scarnato
Frank Sinatra (1915–1998)
Frank Sinatra, Jr. (1944–2016), son of Frank Sinatra 
Nancy Sinatra, daughter of Frank Sinatra
Britney Spears, recording artist, grandmother was a Sicilian immigrant
Bruce Springsteen, (born 1949), mother of Italian ancestry
Gwen Stefani, singer and musician, Italian father
Connie Stevens (born 1938), born Concetta Rosalie Ann Ingoglia, singer and actress
Susan Tedeschi (born 1970), blues and soul singer and songwriter
John Tartaglia (born 1978), singer, actor, dancer and puppeteer
Marc Terenzi (born 1978), pop star, songwriter
Pia Toscano (born 1988), contestant on the tenth season of American Idol
Steven Tyler (born 1948), born Steven Tallarico - Italian Grandfather - Rock Vocalist for Aerosmith
Jerry Vale (1930–2014),  born Genaro Louis Vitaliano, singer
Frankie Valli (born 1937), born Francis Stephen Castelluccio, member of The Four Seasons
Franco Ventriglia (1922–2012), born Francesco Ventriglia, opera singer
Zhavia Ward (born 2001)
Timi Yuro (1940–2004), born Rosemarie Timotea Aurro 
Frank Zappa (1940–1993), rock singer, guitarist
Rosa Ponselle (1897-1981), born Rosa Melba Ponzillo, opera singer

Stand-up comedians
Bryan Callen
Mario Cantone (born 1959), comedian, writer, actor
Pat Cooper, born Pasquale Caputo
Chris D'Elia
Nick DiPaolo
Adam Ferrara
Janeane Garofalo, comedian, actor, liberal political activist and writer, half Italian
Chris Hardwick, comedian, TV host, and musician, half Italian
Pat Henry, comedian, born Patrick Henry Scarnato, long-time opening act for Frank Sinatra
Dom Irrera
Richard Jeni, born Richard John Colangelo
Lisa Lampanelli, three quarters Italian
Matteo Lane (born 1982), comedian, part Italian
Artie Lange, comedian, actor, radio personality, and author best known for  The Howard Stern Show and the comedy sketch series MADtv, half Italian
Jay Leno (born 1950), comedian, former host of The Tonight Show and host of The Jay Leno Show,  half Italian
Sebastian Maniscalco
Guy Marks (1923-1987) (Mario Scarpa) actor, comedian, singer and impressionist
Tammy Pescatelli
Joe Rogan, comedian, former host of Fear Factor, three quarters Italian
Ray Romano, actor, stand-up comedian, screenwriter and voice actor, best known for his role on the sitcom Everybody Loves Raymond
Chris Rush
Judy Tenuta, entertainer, actress, comedian, author, producer, and accordionist;  half Italian
Jackie Vernon  (1924–1987), born Ralph Verrone, stand-up comic and the cartoon voice of Frosty the Snowman
Brittany Furlan (born 1986), comedian and internet personality
Lou Costello
Vic Dibitetto, comedian and internet personality

Adult movie stars
Farrah Abraham, of Italian and Syrian descent from her father's side, Sicilian and Danish descent from her mother's side
Julia Ann, of Italian descent 
Lisa Ann, of Italian and French descent
Kaitlyn Ashley, half German
Lizzy Borden, born Janet Romano-Zicari
Jewel De'Nyle, half Italian, part English, part Spanish, part Native American (Blackfoot)
Tommy Gunn
Ariana Jollee, half Russian Jewish, half Italian
Leena La Bianca
Shy Love, half Italian, half Puerto Rican
Gina Lynn, born Tanya Mercado, half Italian, part Puerto Rican, part Dutch
Nica Noelle, of Italian and Danish descent on her father's side, Irish and Welsh descent on her mother's side
Kirsten Price, born Katherine L'Heureux, mother of Italian descent and father of French descent
Raylene, born Stacey Bernstein, of Italian and Mexican descent on her mother's side, her father is Jewish of Polish and Austrian descent
Amber Rayne (1984-2016) born Meghan Wren, was of mixed Italian, Scottish, Irish and Native American descent
Raven Riley, half Italian, half Cherokee
Bonnie Rotten, of Italian, German, Polish and Jewish descent
Dylan Ryder, half Italian, half German
Joey Stefano (1968–1994)
Michael Stefano
Taryn Thomas, of full Italian descent (Sicilian and Neapolitan)

Adult models
Aria Giovanni, born Cindy Renee Preto, adult model with Penthouse, Hustler, and Club magazines

Professional wrestlers
Trent Acid (1980–2010), born Michael Verdi
Lou Albano (1933–2009)
Mike Awesome (1965-2007), born Michael Lee Alfonso, former ECW and WCW wrestler; mother of Italian descent
The Bella Twins, former professional WWE wrestlers, half Italian, mother of Italian descent
Primo Carnera (1906–1967)
Kacy Catanzaro
Rhyno, born Terrance Guido Gerin, WWE wrestler; Italian immigrant grandparents
John Cena, half Italian, father of Italian descent 
Antonio Cesaro, born Claudio Castagnoli
Rico Chiapparelli
Tommaso Ciampa
Mark Copani,  wrestler best known for his Muhammad Hassan character in WWE; half Italian, half Arab
Sonya Deville, born Daria Rae Berenato
Ilio DiPaolo
Tommy Dreamer, born Thomas James Laughlin
Bubba Ray Dudley, born Mark LoMonaco
Elias, born  Jeffrey Daniel Sciullo
Johnny Gargano
Joy Giovanni, briefly worked for WWE on SmackDown! in 2005, winning female Rookie of the Year
Big Sal E. Graziano, former ECW wrestler
Hulk Hogan, born Terry Eugene Bollea; Italian on father's side 
Steve Lombardi
Joey Marella (1963-1994), born Joseph Anthony Marella, professional wrestling referee; son of legendary wrestler Gorilla Monsoon
Eva Marie, half Italian, Italian on father's side
Ashley Massaro (1979-2019), former WWE wrestler
Gorilla Monsoon (1937-1999), born Robert James Marella
Lenny Montana (1926–1992), former professional wrestler known as "The Zebra Kid" and "Chief Chewacki" in the 1960s
Lisa Moretti (born 1961), born Lisa Mary Moretti, best known by her stage name Ivory, professional wrestler
Nunzio, born James Maritato, professional wrestler
Chuck Palumbo, born Charles Ronald Palumbo, professional wrestler
Angelo Poffo
Lanny Poffo, known as "Leaping Lanny" or "The Genius"; son of Angelo Poffo; brother to Randy Savage
Val Puccio
Tony Parisi, born Antonio Pugliese
Roman Reigns, born Leati Joseph Anoa'i, Samoan father and Italian mother
Paul Roma
Romeo Roselli 
Mandy Rose, born Amanda Rose Saccomanno, professional wrestler
Mike Rotunda, known as "Irwin R. Schyster", wrestled with the WWF from 1991 to 2004
Bruno Sammartino (1935–2018), born Bruno Leopoldo Francesco Sammartino, former professional wrestler
"Macho Man" Randy Savage (1952–2011), born Randall Mario Poffo; son of Angelo Poffo; brother of Lanny Poffo
Peter Senerchia, former professional wrestler also known as Tazz
Velvet Sky, born Jamie Lynn Szantyr
Bray Wyatt, born Windham Lawrence Rotunda (father of Italian descent), third generation professional wrestler, son of Mike Rotunda, grandson of Blackjack Mulligan, brother of Bo Dallas
Vince Russo, Creative writer, and booker at WCW

Entertainers who cannot be categorized
Toni Basil (born 1943), born Antonia Christina Basilotta, dancer, actress, singer
James Berardinelli, film critic
Judy Canova (1913–1983), born Juliette Canova, comedian, actress, singer, and radio personality
Joe Cino (1931–1967), theater director and cafe owner credited with launching off-off-Broadway
Danny Daniels, dancer
Joe Dallesandro (born 1948), underground film star and model made famous by  Andy Warhol and Paul Morrissey
Giancarlo Esposito (born 1958), actor and director
Fabian (born 1943), born in Philadelphia, Pennsylvania; teen idol of the late 1950s and early 1960s; rose to national prominence after performing several times on American Bandstand; born Fabiano Anthony Bonaparte, he adopted the stage name Fabian Forte but has always been known by his first name only
Eugene Louis Faccuito, dancer and choreographer
Angelo Faticoni, contortionist 
Rosina Ferrara (1861–1934), model to 19th-century American and British painters, muse of American expatriate artist John Singer Sargent
Peter Gennaro, choreographer
Phillip James DeFranco (born 1985), born Philip James Franchini Jr., YouTube personality
Keemstar (born 1982), born Daniel M. Keem, YouTuber, podcaster, and streamer
Frank Lentini (1889–1966), born Francesco A. Lentini, born in Siracusa, Sicily; born with three longer legs, two sets of genitals and one rudimentary foot on his third leg; his primary legs also grew into different lengths; at age nine, he moved to the United States and entered the sideshow business
Tom and Ray Magliozzi conductors of radio show Car Talk
Anthony Pusateri, choreographer
Shane Salerno (born 1972), screenwriter, producer, and director
Hank Sanicola (1914–1974), American music manager, publisher, businessman, and pianist

References

Entertainers
Entertainers